"My Size" is a song by John Entwistle. The song is the first track on his debut solo album Smash Your Head Against the Wall and ends with the main riff from one of Entwistle's popular compositions, "Boris the Spider". "My Size" was released as a promotional single in 1971.

When Entwistle was asked about the song, he said simply: "'My Size,' was just written in the studio, we wrote the chord progressions and then I went home and composed the tune and the words." In another interview Entwistle called "My Size" a sequel to his 1966 hit with The Who, "Boris the Spider". He said, "I wrote it as a sequel to 'Boris the Spider' for our manager. Our manager wanted me to put 'Boris the Spider' on my album. So I wrote 'My Size' and I wrote it in a sort of code so it sounds as if it were being sung about a woman. Then I stuck the ending on it as a clue. It wasn't a very good clue, I suppose."

Entwistle later said: "A lot of people thought that 'My Size' from 'Smash Your Head' was actually the new Who single."

The 'My Size' versions on the Sundazed and Repertoire re-releases are completely different. Both of the LPs match the Sundazed version.

When the BBC were reviewing the album So Who's the Bass Player? The Ox Anthology they said that the sound sounded like a Black Sabbath song, namely "Sabbath Bloody Sabbath".

References

The Who songs
1971 songs
Songs written by John Entwistle